The N-260, also known as Eje Pirenaico (Pyrenaean Axis), is the northernmost east–west national road in Spain.

In contrast to the majority of Spanish national roads, which were specially constructed during the mid-20th century, the path for this highway was established at 80's decade over several previously existing secondary (or even local) roads. This fact, along with the mountainous characteristics of the eastern Pyrenees regions it crosses, is the consequence of several stretches being uneven and narrow paths with features further from the modern standard national roads.

The N-260 is in process of being upgraded to the A-26 autovía.

These are the sections of the N-260 road:

Roads in Catalonia
Transport in Aragon
National roads in Spain